Brigitta Bereczki (born 7 December 1966) is a Hungarian biathlete. She competed at the 1992 Winter Olympics and the 1994 Winter Olympics.

References

External links
 

1966 births
Living people
Biathletes at the 1992 Winter Olympics
Biathletes at the 1994 Winter Olympics
Hungarian female biathletes
Olympic biathletes of Hungary
Place of birth missing (living people)
20th-century Hungarian women